Annette may refer to:

Film and television
 Walt Disney Presents: Annette, 1950s television series
 Annette (film), a 2021 musical film

Other
 Annette (given name), list of people with the name
 Annette Island, Alaska
 Tropical Storm Annette (disambiguation)
 2839 Annette, an asteroid
 Annette (album), by Paul Bley